Libya allegedly bankrolled the presidential campaign of Nicolas Sarkozy with up to €50 million in pay-outs. Sarkozy has denied wrongdoing and rejected suggestions he was a Libyan agent of influence during his tenure as president of France. He has since officially been charged for corruption on March 21, 2018.

Background

2007 election
In May 2007, Nicolas Sarkozy was elected President of France in a six-point victory over Ségolène Royal. Sarkozy officially spent €21 million on his campaign. The size of the campaign spend, relative to those seen in United States elections, prompted French scholar Sophie Meunier to later declare that "French politicians are, therefore, not enslaved to special interests or Super-PACs as they are in the U.S."

During the 2007 French election, candidates were limited to spending no more than €21 million, and no single person could donate in excess of €7500 to a candidate. In addition, the sources of donations had to be publicly declared and contributions from foreign nationals were prohibited.

Libyan détente and later reversal
In December 2007, following Sarkozy's inauguration as President of France, Libyan leader Muammar Gaddafi visited the country on Sarkozy's invitation, over the objections of both the political opposition and members of Sarkozy's own government. Gaddafi's visit to France was his first in over 35 years; during the trip, France agreed to sell Libya 21 Airbus aircraft, and the two countries signed a nuclear cooperation agreement. Negotiations for the sale of over a dozen French Dassault Rafale fighter jets, plus military helicopters, were also initiated during Gaddafi's visit.

In 2011, France, under Sarkozy, voted for international military intervention in the Libyan Civil War against the Gaddafi government in United Nations Security Council Resolution 1973 and, subsequently, attacked Libyan government forces in Opération Harmattan, in support of the National Transitional Council. France stated the move was to protect Libyan civilians.

Allegations
The same month that French forces were committed to the Libyan conflict, Saif-al-Islam Gaddafi, a son of Muammar Gaddafi, gave an interview to Euronews in which he first publicly claimed that the Libyan state had donated €50 million to Sarkozy's 2007 presidential campaign in exchange for access and favours by Sarkozy. He was quoted as saying: "We funded it and we have all the details and are ready to reveal everything. The first thing we want this clown to do is to give the money back to the Libyan people. He was given assistance so that he could help them. But he's disappointed us: give us back our money." Sarkozy rejected the claim by Gaddafi.

The following October, the claim that Libya had funded Sarkozy's 2007 election campaign was repeated by former Libyan prime minister Baghdadi Mahmudi. Investigative website Mediapart subsequently published several documents appearing to prove a payment of €50 million, and also published a claim by Ziad Takieddine that he had personally handed three briefcases full of cash to Sarkozy. French magistrates later acquired diaries of former Libyan oil minister Shukri Ghanem in which payments to Sarkozy were mentioned. Shortly thereafter, however, Ghanem was found dead, floating in the Danube in Austria and thereby preventing his corroboration of the diaries.

In 2014, television station France 3 released an audio recording made by Delphine Minoui on March 16, 2011, during which Minoui interviewed Muammar Gaddafi. In the recording, Gaddafi told Minoui that Sarkozy had approached him seeking funds for his presidential election campaign while still serving as French interior minister.

In February 2018, the Asharq Al-Awsat newspaper quoted a source alleging that Sarkozy had promised Libyan representatives improved relations between France and Libya should he be elected president, and that he would wrap up the matter of the bombing of UTA Flight 772. As recently as 2018, Saif al-Islam reiterated his 2011 claim, and since also added that a former officer of the Libyan intelligence service was at that time in possession of a recording of a meeting between Muammar Gaddafi and Sarkozy that occurred in Tripoli in 2007, during which payments were discussed.

Investigation
In 2013 the Central Directorate of the Judicial Police (DCPJ) officially opened an investigation into the allegations of Libyan funding of Sarkozy's 2007 election campaign. In March 2018, Sarkozy-era interior minister Brice Hortefeux voluntarily appeared before French police for questioning. Several arrests have been made in relation to the inquiry.

Arrests and charges

Reaction
Sarkozy's political party, The Republicans, issued a statement following his arrest in which it said the former president had the party's full support. Spokesman Christian Jacob later suggested that the accusations against Sarkozy were politically motivated.

Following Sarkozy's arrest, Eric Ciotti expressed confidence the former president would be exonerated.

See also
 Bettencourt affair
 France–Libya relations
 London School of Economics Gaddafi links

Notes

References

2018 in French politics
2018 scandals
Foreign electoral intervention
France–Libya relations
2007 French presidential election
Muammar Gaddafi
Nicolas Sarkozy
Political scandals in France
March 2018 events in France
Allegations